With You is a 2016 Chinese streaming television series based on the novel The Best of Us (最好的我们) by Ba Yue Chang An (八月长安). It stars Liu Haoran and Tan Songyun in lead. It aired on iQiyi from 8 April to 14 May 2016.

Synopsis
This series follows Geng Geng, a slightly awkward but adorable first year high schooler who feels like she's not smart enough to be at the prestigious Zhen Hua High School. The first day she happens to meet her future deskmate, the brilliant Yu Huai, and although they bicker at first, they soon form a strong friendship. They all become good friends with their classmates and have a strong bond with their teacher, Zhang Ping. Geng Geng also attracts the attention of the school's resident rebel, Lu Xing He, who quickly falls in love with her and isn't shy about announcing his crush to the world.

Cast

 Class 5

 Tan Songyun as Geng Geng
 Liu Haoran as Yu Huai
 Dong Qing as Jiang Nian Nian (β)
 Chen Mengxi as Jian Dan
 Li Jiacheng as Han Xu
 Zhang Wenting as Wen Xiao Xiao
 Liu Wenqu as Zhu Yao
 Liu Qiheng as Xu Yan Liang

 Faculty

 Fang Wenqiang as Zhang Ping
 Gao Wenfeng as Zhang Feng
 Zhang Lei as School Dean Pan
 Sheng Yuqin as Chinese teacher
 Fan Yimeng as Shen Tong
 Zhang Hang as Zhang Lai Shun
 Li Shengda as Gym teacher

 Others

 Wang Yuexin as Lu Xing He
 Liang Hao as Zhou Mo
 Chao Ran as Luo Zhi
 Nie Zihao as Sheng Huai Nan
 An Jie as Bei Lin
 Zhao Yansong as Geng's father
 Qu Haifeng as Geng's mother
 Rong Zishan as Lin Fan

 Lan Tian as older Lin Fan

 Li Jiawei as Aunt Qi
 Liu Meihan as Japanese student
 Sun Jiayu as Chen Xue Jun
 Li Aijing as Ye Zhan Yan
 Sun Yingying as Ling Xiao Qian
 Dan Xiaohang as Zheng Ya Min
 Lian Jie as Lai Chun Yang
 Ning Zi as Yu's mother
 Lu Ying as Jiang Nian Nian (β)'s fake dad
 Ye Zhengtong as Fan Bin
 Sun Zilin as Wu Tong
 Cao Dongyu as Liu Fang Ping
 Yu Wentao as Wang Zhi Yong
 He Yajie as Lu Yang

Soundtrack

Reception
The series was hailed as the Best Youth Drama by critics in recent years, and was praised for its realistic portrayal of youth and complex characters. The drama tackles common issues like school struggles, family issues, and the making and breaking of friendships and relationships; making it relatable to viewers. It has over 2 billion views online and a rating of 8.9 on Douban.

Awards and nominations

Sequel
With You is the first installment of a youth series written by Bayue Changan, which also includes My Huckleberry Friends and Unrequited Love.

References

External links
 With You on Weibo
 With You on Douban

2010s teen drama television series
IQIYI original programming
Chinese web series
Chinese high school television series
2016 Chinese television series debuts
2016 web series debuts
Television series about teenagers